The Ukraine women's national beach handball team is the national team of Ukraine. It is governed by the Ukraine Handball Federation and takes part in international beach handball competitions.

World Championships results
2008 – 9th place
2010 – 4th place
2014 – 4th place

External links
Official website
IHF profile

Women's national beach handball teams
Beach handball
Handball in Ukraine